Andrea Perego is an Italo-Australian journalist and writer. After living in Sydney, he is now working on projects in Venice and Berlin. In Australia he worked as a broadcaster for SBS Radio, doing reports that had wide resonance, such as the one about the murder of two Swiss Guards in the Vatican.

In Italy, he has worked for Filippi Editore as the curator of a book series of Venetian subjects. The new updated edition of Curiosità veneziane by Giuseppe Tassini (first published in 1863) is part of the series.

In 2009 he worked on Peter Greenaway's The Wedding at Cana (Italian version), as the voice of Christ. Greenaway's vision was exhibited at Fondazione Giorgio Cini during the Venice Biennale.

His first collection of short stories in Italian, Racconti in cornice, was published in January 2014 by Supernova Edizioni.
The English edition of the book appeared under the title Red Moons and Cornflowers in March 2015, published in paperback and Kindle format for worldwide distribution via Amazon.

His first novel, Le leggi del tempo, was published in Italian in October 2016 by Supernova, Kindle and paperback format. It's a mystery set in Venice in 1730. 
The English edition launched in January 2019 under the title The Laws of Time.

In March 2018 Andrea Perego published, with Supernova, Casanova in Berlin, that recounts the two months Giacomo Casanova spent in Berlin in 1764. The book is published in four languages. The French edition is a critical transcription from Casanova's manuscript, by Andrea Perego who also edited the series and wrote the new translation in Italian. 

Barbara - Un affare di Stato, was published in Italian by Supernova in 2020, and in English in 2022 (Barbara - An Affair of State). The book tells the story of Barbara Campanini, a celebrated 18th century ballet dancer, known as "la Barbarina", and the international intrigue that ensued when she tried to resist the overtures of Frederick the Great to bring her to his Court in Berlin. "Barbara" has received the patronage of the City of Parma, where the dancer was born.

In September 2022 Andrea Perego's second novel, Il gentiluomo was released by Supernova. The novel, published in Italian, tells the story of a French nobleman who is forced to flee the Revolution. He goes to England, where he must make a new life for himself. Far from the court of Marie Antoinette, he finds himself in London, trying to earn a living within the English high society of the time, mixing with the likes of Georgiana Cavendish, Duchess of Devonshire, Beau Brummell and Jane Austen, with whom he begins a correspondence.

References

Year of birth missing (living people)
Living people

Australian people of Italian descent
Australian journalists